Akuoma Ugo Tracy Omeoga (born 22 June 1992) is a Nigerian–American bobsledder. She competed for the Nigeria contingent on the Nigeria bobsled team in the two-woman event at the 2018 Winter Olympics. Omegoa was born in Saint Paul, Minnesota, her parents had moved from Nigeria to the United States to attend school. Later in her life, Omeoga attended the University of Minnesota.

References

External links
 

1992 births
Living people
Nigerian female bobsledders
Olympic bobsledders of Nigeria
Bobsledders at the 2018 Winter Olympics
Place of birth missing (living people)